Ruby Pearl Tyrees  (July 22, 1891 – November 23, 1965) was an American baseball pitcher in the Negro leagues. He played with the Chicago American Giants and Royal Poinciana Hotel in 1916 and with the Cleveland Browns in 1924.

References

External links
 and Baseball-Reference Black Baseball stats and Seamheads

Chicago American Giants players
Cleveland Browns (baseball) players
1891 births
1965 deaths
20th-century African-American sportspeople
Baseball pitchers